LV Vulpeculae, also known as Nova Vulpeculae 1968 no. 1, was the first of two novae in the constellation of Vulpecula which erupted in 1968. It was discovered by George Alcock who observed it from the back garden of his home in Farcet, England, on the morning of 15 April 1968. The next night it was independently discovered by Midtskoven in Norway.   It reached a peak apparent magnitude of 4.79 on 17 April 1968.  It was visible to the naked eye at the same time HR Delphini (also discovered by George Alcock) was a naked eye object, and the two novae were less than 15 degrees apart on the sky.

Before its eruption, LV Vulpeculae was a  magnitude 16.2 object.   It is classified as a "fast nova", meaning its brightness declined by more than 3 magnitudes in less than 100 days.

A small emission nebula (shell), a few arc seconds in diameter, has been detected surrounding this nova. However, there are several field stars overlapping the nebula, which makes deriving quantitative information from shell images difficult.

All novae are binary stars, with a "donor" star orbiting a white dwarf. The two stars are so close to each other that matter is transferred from the donor star to the white dwarf.

References

Vulpeculae 1968, Nova
Vulpecula
Vulpeculae, LV
J19480043+2710173